Jonas Björkman and Jacco Eltingh were the defending champions, but Eltingh did not compete this year.Björkman teamed up with Patrick Rafter, and they won the title defeating the first-seeded Indian team of Mahesh Bhupathi and Leander Paes in the final, 6–3, 4–6, 6–4, 6–7(10–12), 6–4. This would be Rafter's only grand slam doubles title.

Seeds

Draw

Finals

Top half

Section 1

Section 2

Bottom half

Section 3

Section 4

External links
 1999 Australian Open – Men's draws and results at the International Tennis Federation

Men's Doubles
Australian Open (tennis) by year – Men's doubles